John Wilson (18 May 1940 – 15 June 2019) was an Australian rules football player who played in the Victorian Football League (VFL) in 1959 for the Richmond Football Club. He played in six AFL games during his career.

References 

 Hogan P: The Tigers Of Old, Richmond FC, Melbourne 1996

External links
 
 Tigerland Archive

Richmond Football Club players
1940 births
2019 deaths
Australian rules footballers from Melbourne
People educated at Melbourne High School